Brigham County Park is a county park located in western Dane County, Wisconsin near the village of Blue Mounds. The park encompasses  and includes 25 campsites. Other amenities in the park include nature and snowshoe trails, a picnic area, a playground, and volleyball and horseshoe courts. A  bicycle trail connects the campground to the Military Ridge State Trail.

The park was named for Ebenezer Brigham, the first permanent European resident of Dane County. Brigham served as a colonel in the Black Hawk War and played a prominent role in Wisconsin's territorial politics. He and his family owned a large amount of land in the area, and the park was formed when the family donated its land to the county. A state historical marker in the park commemorates Brigham and his family's role in forming the park. Nearby Blue Mound State Park was also formed from Brigham's land.

The mound is the partner of the taller Blue Mound, which is the highest point in southern Wisconsin, and one of the two mounds that gives the village of Blue Mounds its name.

References

External links
Brigham County Park

County parks in Wisconsin
Protected areas of Dane County, Wisconsin